Events from the year 1744 in Canada.

Incumbents
French Monarch: Louis XV
British and Irish Monarch: George II

Governors
Governor General of New France: Charles de la Boische, Marquis de Beauharnois
Colonial Governor of Louisiana: Pierre de Rigaud, Marquis de Vaudreuil-Cavagnial
Governor of Nova Scotia: Paul Mascarene
Commodore-Governor of Newfoundland: Thomas Smith

Events
 France declares war on England (March 15)
 Treaty of Lancaster (English-Iroquois).
 Having begun in Europe in 1740, The War of the Austrian Succession spreads to North America (King George's War).
 Nicolas-Joseph de Noyelles de Fleurimont succeeded Pierre Gaultier de Varennes et de La Vérendrye as the Commandant of the western French forts.

Births
 May 22 - Juan Francisco de la Bodega y Quadra, naval officer, explorer, administrator (d.1794)
 October 6 - James McGill, merchant, philanthropist (d.1813)
 December 10 - William Berczy, painter, architect, author, and colonizer (d.1813)

Full date unknown
 Elias Hardy, lawyer and office-holder (d.1798)

Deaths

Historical documents
Alerting Fort Albany to war with France, Hudson's Bay Company orders readying of men and arms and getting "Trading Indians" to patrol daily

Louisbourg francophone man obtains Council warrant to capture chief and other "Chickinakady Indians" he says murdered crew of British ship

Council meets with Saint John River Indigenous leaders who have heard rumours of British-French war and seek (and get) assurances of peace

Duvivier's force of 900 regular troops and militia from Île-Royale takes Canso from its 80-man garrison on May 13 and burns settlement

"Breaking the French measures;[...]timely Succours receiv'd [and] our French refusing to take up arms against us" halts Annapolis attack

Nova Scotia Council reports that in June and August attacks, local Acadians helped enemy "while we were entirely Deserted by them"

Word from Île-Royale is that 23 British fishing and commercial ships have been taken by large schooner and five other French privateers

New York governor George Clinton tells Assembly he has increased defences (including Six Nations scouts) at Oswego, Saratoga and Albany

In July and August, Boston privateer takes French ships on "great banks," plus other French fishers on northeast coast of Newfoundland

Privateer brings in to Boston three French ships, including one carrying to Canada wine, brandy, iron and dry goods worth £8-9,000

Under flag of truce, three vessels arrive at Boston from Île-Royale with 350 British prisoners taken from Canso and "sundry Vessels, &c."

French abhor inhumanity of privateers who took New York ship by firing after it surrendered, including one "chew'd" musket ball

New Hampshire privateer with Île-Royale prizes is attacked by "Indians on Cape Sables," and later by canoes (driven off by swivel guns)

Report of arrival of 70-gun and three other French warships plus 18 armed merchant ships at Île-Royale with arms for Quebec-built warship

Duvivier orders Minas Acadians to supply horses, handlers and gunpowder, and to pledge loyalty to French king (Note: "savages" used)

Nova Scotia commander Mascarene reports skirmish and tactical issues (including Indigenous fighters' "sculking way of fighting")

Acadians ask French not to take their meagre harvest and to withdraw, citing "mild" government they live under (Note: "savages" used)

In October, captured French privateer's crew is found to include "Irish Roman-catholick soldiers formerly of" Canso regiment

Nova Scotia Council allows commandeering of vessel and equipment to counter "great body of Indians" threatening from Minas and Chignecto

Massachusetts declares war on French-allied Indigenous peoples in November, and sets bounties for scalps of men, women and children

Mascarene says loyal as well as disloyal Acadians "must unavoidably share in the trouble that military people generally bring with them"

Mascarene praises daughter of former seigneur for her loyalty, but will not defend property of her disloyal family (Note: "savages" used)

Council hears of Cobequid Acadians' loyalty and non-participation "in the last troubles " (except when forced to assist)

Annapolis River Acadians told loyalty includes supplying non-combatant personnel, no matter their fear of Indigenous people's "resentment"

Map: lands surrounding Gulf of St. Lawrence and lower St. Lawrence River

Dominique Nafréchoux of Montreal signs deed of emancipation for his slave Dominique-François Mentor to take effect on his death

Joseph Robson wonders what keeps Hudson's Bay Company from competing with French upriver, and then finds it hard going up Nelson River

Minister to Kanien’kéhà:ka reports having to calm them after "our restless Enemies the French" spread rumour of British attack

New Hampshire proclamation summons volunteers for expedition against Cape Breton Island (Île-Royale)

Soldier's widow and step-mother of his children has to ask Council's permission to sell his property, as "none Other would Accept of that Office"

"There is a satisfaction even, in giving way to Grief" - On duty in Belgium, young James Wolfe writes home about his soldier brother's death

References 

 
Canada
44